Central Prison and Correctional Home, Thiruvananthapuram, also known as "Poojappura Central Jail", or "Central Prison, Poojappura", is a jail in Poojappura in Thiruvananthapuram in the Indian state of Kerala. It was established in1886 as a part of Travancore It is one of three Kerala prisons along with Kannur and Thrissur. These institutions confine convicts sentenced to above 6 months. Indicted suspects are accommodated in central prisons, if nearby jails are overcrowded.

History
The history of Travancore jails begins in 1862 with three Principal Jails. 1873 Central Jail at Trivandrum was sanctioned and started functioning inside a fort in a building that was used as barracks for the Nayar Brigade.

In September 1886 it was transferred and relocated in purpose-built structures in Poojappura.

Police station lock-ups were jailing prisoners whose sentences were below one month. In 1949 when the state of Travancore-Cochin was formed, two Central Jails operated at Trivandrum and Viyyur and 7 Sub Jails in the Cochin part of the State. The senior-most of the Superintendent Central Prisons acted as the Ex-Officio Inspector General of Prisons until 31-03-1953.

The first Central Prison was established at Kannur in 1869. The First District Jail was established at Kozhikode in 1861. The first Open Prison was established at Nettukaltheri, Trivandrum on 28 August 1962. The first Women's Prison was established at Neyyattinkara, Trivandrum in 1990. The first Inspector General was appointed on 1 April 1953 and made independent in the discharge of function as per the provisions in the Prisons Act. The Prison Headquarters/ Office of the Inspector General of Prisons was sanctioned with effect from 1 April 1953. Since 1986 officers from the Police Department have been appointed to act as Inspector General of Prisons. In September 1975 the Administrative control of Social Welfare Institutions and the Probation services were transferred to the Social Welfare Department.

The history of Jails Department in Kerala begins with the formation of the State in 1956. Jails existed in Travancore - Cochin State and British Malabar State were reorganized and formed the Jail department. The first administration report of the Jails of Travancore state for 1862 and 1863 published during the period of Dewan Sir.T.Madhava Rao. According to this report there were the Principal Jail at Trivandrum (Fort) and the Divisional Jails at Quilon and Alleppey besides the Sub Jails attached to the District or Zilla Courts. The Principal Jail at Fort which was housed in the old barracks of Nair Brigade, established in 1861 upgraded to the status of Central Jail in 1873. This Jail was shifted to the present site at Poojappura in 1886. Industrial activities were started in the Central Prison in the same year by then Dewan Sir.T.Ramarao. Subsequently, reforms intended to improve the condition of convicts were also introduced. In 1890, the ruler of the state sanctioned money grant to destitute prisoners during their release to enable them to reach homes. A separate block was constructed in Central Prison for female prisoners in 1904. Medical administration of the convicts was placed under the State Chief Medical Officer.

Prison manufactory
As the emphasis is on reformation and rehabilitation, convicted prisoners are, at first, imparted vocational training and once they acquire sufficient proficiency their services are utilized for carpentry, tailoring, black smithy, weaving, shoemaking etc. We started modernizing our manufacturing units and providing technical classes in regular intervals with the help of Kerala University, Polytechnic, willing NGOs etc. are under way. The manufactory units are working in Central Prison & Correctional Homes at Thiruvananthapuram, Thrissur and Kannur. Besides the manufactory units in Central Prisons we have at least two production units in every Jails in Kerala.

The various Manufactory Units in Jails are
(i) Carpentry Unit
The services of permanent staffs such as Carpentry Foreman, Carpentry Instructor are available to train inmates in the carpentry unit. Furniture made in this unit is of high quality timber. An average of 50 prisoners are being trained here. Carpentry units are functioning at Central Prison & Correctional Homes, Thiruvananthapuram and Kannur and Open Prison & Correctional Home, Nettukaltheri. Wooden furniture for government departments are being made in it. Units have been upgraded to suit modern demands. Furniture for the general public is manufactured and supplied as per the order.

(ii) Smithy Unit
The permanent post of Smithy Instructor is available in Smithy Unit. An average of 20 prisoners are being trained here. The products are mainly used in prisons but are also available to the general public at reasonable prices. These units are functioning in Central Prison & Correctional Homes, Thiruvananthapuram, Thrissur and Kannur. Agricultural implements required for public are manufactured and supplied on demand.

(iii) Weaving Unit
Permanent post of, weaving instructors, weavers and weaving assistants are available in weaving unit. An average of 50 prisoners are being trained here. Materials required for the tailoring units, Bed sheets, Blanket and ‘Mundu’ are made here for the use of prisoners. Towels, H.C. towels, bed sheets and mattresses made in this unit are made available to the public at reasonable prices. Such units are functioning in Central Prison & Correctional Homes, Thiruvananthapuram, Thrissur and Kannur.

(iv) Soap Making Unit
A soap manufacturing unit was first set up at Thiruvananthapuram Central Prison. Soap and phenol required for various Jails in the state are manufactured and distributed from here. An average of 20 inmates are engaged in it. Other jails are also encouraged to start such units. Premium soap products are also made and sold to public.

(v) Paper Bag Unit
An average of 25 prisoners work here. Products are manufactured as per orders received from other establishments/stores/public. Paper bags have been manufactured and distributed to Hantex, Kalyan and Parthas and other leading clothing retailers in Thiruvananthapuram. Paper Bag Unit is functioning at Central Prison & Correctional Home, Thiruvananthapuram.

(vi) Tailoring Unit
A permanent post of Tailoring Instructor, is available in Tailoring Unit. An average of 20 prisoners work in it. Prisoners' clothes are made in this unit. In addition, ready-made garments for general public are also made here and sold through the Free-Fashionista Unit / Sales counter. These units are functioning in Central Prison & Correctional Homes, Thiruvananthapuram, Thrissur and Kannur.

(vii) Book binding unit
An average of 10 inmates are employed in it. Binding work for prison purposes is done here. Book Binding Unit is functioning at Central Prison & Correctional Home, Kannur.

(viii) Automobile Workshop & Spray Painting Unit
An Automobile Workshop & Spray Painting Unit is functioning to repair vehicles of various Jails in South Zone. The services of prison staff with Polytechnic / Engineering degree are used to supervise the unit.

(ix) Shoe manufacturing unit
There is a shoe manufacturing unit functioning at Central Prison Thiruvananthapuram Manufactory. slippers made here under the brand name of “Freedom Walk” are sold to public through the Free-Fashionista unit.

Vocational Training
Vocational training and skill development programmes are treated as essential features of Prison correctional programmes. These help in improving work skills, discipline, sense of economic security, self confidence and self reliance and developing right attitude towards work and dignity of labour. Computer training programmes are conducted with IGNOU and Akshaya IT Mission. Every year various traditional as well as modern vocational training programmes such as listed below are organized in prisons.
LED bulb making, Driving, Food production, Computer courses, Tailoring, Beauty parlor management, Electrical wiring and plumbing, Toy making, Mushroom cultivation, Welding, Fashion designing, Health and Sanitation, Mobile phone technology, Readymade dress making, Rubber Tapping, Aluminium fabrication, Umbrella making, Soap making, Financial accounting, Paper bag making, Phenyl making, Vehicle maintenance and repair, Furniture making, Photography, A/C and refrigerator technician, Carpentry, Documentary Production, Solar energy designing and maintenance, Poultry Farming, Editing, JCB/Tipper/Triller Operations, Goat/Cow/Buffalo/Pig/Rabbit Farming, Flower Pot Production, Nettipattam Production, Coconut tree climbing, Agriculture Training

Recreation facilities
Prisoners in all Jails are provided with indoor game boards such as chess board, carom board and ludo board. Prisoners are also provided facilities for outdoor games such as volleyball, cricket, football and badminton in prisons which have sufficient space available. Facilities for watching television and listening music are provided in all Jails. FM radio broadcast was started in Viyyur Central Prison & Correctional Home. Music, drama, sports clubs, orchestra etc. are functioning in all major Jails. Jail welfare day is celebrated every year with various types of competitions and cultural events. Other festivals and nationally important days are celebrated in a befitting manner. News papers and magazines are provided @ one per fifteen inmates. All Jails are equipped with library facilities also.

Food for Freedom

All Jails in the State have a full-fledged kitchen catering to their requirements as stipulated in Prison Rules. Earlier, work at Jail kitchens started as early as 02.00 a.m. and continued till 05.00 p.m. Those were the days when the Jail department used to follow traditional ways of cooking in which all works were done manually. By 2010s they started modernizing their kitchens with latest technology which helped them to save time and effort. Experiences in catering to a large number of people and the efficiency of new machineries emboldened them to take up catering in a commercial scale. At that time the hotels, restaurants, wayside eateries etc. were charging exorbitant rates and there existed a demand for quality food at reasonable rates. Spurred by this demand Jail Department started Freedom Food Making Units at Central Prison & Correctional Home, Thiruvananthapuram, in 2011. At first, they started making Chappathy packets and Vegetable curry/chicken curry/egg curry packets. The aim was to always provide tasty and quality food at reasonable rates which has been whole heartedly embraced by the general public and their support and encouragement egged them on to start similar Food Making Units at other Jails also which has all turned out to be successful with the Public. They have since then expanded their products to snacks, bakery products, pickles etc. which has also turned out to be successful and are in great demand.

Cafeteria
The idea of ​​setting up a cafeteria along the National Highway near Poojappura Central Jail was prompted by the idea that the general public should have a place to sit and eat while taking food from the food sales counters of the jail department. Launched on January 19, 2016, the cafeteria unit is fully air-conditioned and can seat up to 24 people at a time. There is also a take-away counter for shopping. Built at a cost of Rs 30 lakhs, the unit is equipped with car parking and mobile recharging facilities. The unit also has an open hut model that can seat up to 24 people. Adjacent to this there is a juice parlor and an open kitchen. The products are being offered to the public at affordable rates while providing similar facilities as of the top hotels. The cafeteria is open from 6.30 am to 9 pm.

Free Fashionista
A well-equipped sewing unit is functioning inside the jail. Provides inmates with the necessary training through tailoring instructors in prisons. In the early days, this unit was used only for sewing prisoners' uniforms. Since only one type of work was done, the people working here had little opportunity to show off their sewing skills. Free Fashionista was started at the Central Jail & Correctional Home, Thiruvananthapuram with the aim of making better ready - made garments available to the public at affordable prices by utilizing the sewing skills of the prisoners. The public can not only buy ready-made textiles for women, men and children, but also beautiful paintings, decorative vases, other artifacts and Freedom Hawai slippers made by the prisoners.

Organic Vegetable Cultivation
With a view to getaway the poisonous vegetables from our neighboring states Central Prison started organic cultivation of vegetables in 30 acres of land.

Beauty Parlour
To provide vocational training to prisoners based on their interests and once they acquire sufficient proficiency their labour is utilized productively. In case of prisoners who already possess proficiency in any of the trades available in Jails, their services are utilized for providing training to others and also to improve the production of such units. In the case of barbers there exists a demand for this service in society and we decided to give training to inmates in beautician course and opened beauty parlours at Central Prison & Correctional Home, Thiruvananthapuram, which is functioning profitably.

Interview with Prisoners
Prisoners are allowed to see and communicate with their family members, relatives, friends and legal advisors for procuring bail, filing of appeal, for arranging the management of prisoners property or any other family affairs. Those who come for an interview with a prison inmate have to submit an application to the Prison Superintendent along with a photo identity proof. In instances where more than one person wishes to visit a particular prisoner, one application is sufficient. But copy of ID proof of each visitors have to be made available with it. In all Jails there is a specified place for conducting interviews. The maximum time allowed is ordinarily 30 minutes and the maximum number of persons allowed at a time is five. The Superintendent can deny any interview if there is any sufficient reason. If a prisoner is seriously ill, the Superintendent shall permit the interview to take place at Prison Hospital. Consulate Officials are allowed to visit citizens of their Country who are incarcerated, for communication and arrangement of legal matters.

Welfare Activities
Chief Welfare Officer at Prison Headquarters, Regional Welfare Officers at each region, Welfare Officers at major Prisons and officers who is in charge at other Prisons, are appointed to coordinate the welfare activities for the inmates at the prisons, regions and state level.
Healthy competitions in various sports and games, arts and literature are conducted in Prisons.
Yoga and the related programmes are conducted in association with Governmental / Non-Governmental organizations.
Integrated Counselling and Testing Centers Viz., "Jyothis" services are provided in all Jails under Kerala State AIDS Control Society. These centers conduct testing for a number of diseases including HIV and render counselling to the prisoners regarding the diseases.
Library, Newspapers, Television, FM Radio, Canteen services are provided to the prisoners in all the Jails.
Closed Circuit Tele Vision (CCTV) is installed in all the jails to facilitate accountability and security.
Major cultural, religious and national days are celebrated with sumptuous meals and cultural activities.
Jail Welfare Day celebrations are conducted once in every year and various games sports / games and literal/cultural programmes are arranged for the prisoners in all Jails.
Recreational facilities in terms of indoor (Caroms, Chess, Snake & Ladder, Ludo etc.) are provided to the prisoners in all Jails and outdoor (Volley Ball, Basket Ball, Badminton etc.) games are also provided to the prisoners in Jails which have sufficient space.
The welfare activities carried out in various jails are given due importance and promptly reported in major print / visual / social medias.

Other Important Activities
• Divine materials such as “Kunchala” and special thread for the use at Sree Padmanabha Swami Temple ceremonies.

• Production and sale of Ornamental Nettipattom and Umbrella.

• A musical club of inmates with full-fledged musical instruments is formed and the training is going on.

Notable inmates
Vaikom Muhammad Basheer - activist and writer; released in 1943
Dharmarajan - convicted in the Suryanelli rape case
K.P. Jayanandan - serial killer; escaped and was recaptured in 2013
Kayamkulam Kochunni - legendary outlaw; possibly
Rosamma Punnoose - activist and politician; was arrested along with her sister; was released in 1942

Gallery

References

Prisons in Kerala
Buildings and structures in Thiruvananthapuram